Warawarani (Aymara warawara star, -ni a suffix, "the one with a star", also spelled Wara Warani) is a  mountain in the Bolivian Andes. It is located in the Cochabamba Department, Tapacari Province. Warawarani lies west of Sapanani and northeast of Turu Qullu.

References 

Mountains of Cochabamba Department